QNB may refer to:

 QNB Bank, an independent bank headquartered in Quakertown, Pennsylvania
 QNB Group, a commercial bank headquartered in Doha, Qatar
 3-Quinuclidinyl benzilate